Countrified is the fifth studio album by Canadian country music band Emerson Drive. It was released in 2006 as their first issue for the Midas Records label. In the U.S., the album produced three singles on the Hot Country Songs charts: "A Good Man", "Moments" (the band's first Number One hit), and "You Still Own Me". Two of the album's tracks are covers: "You Still Own Me" was previously a hit in Canada for Johnny Reid, and "The Devil Went Down to Georgia" is a cover of a song made famous by the Charlie Daniels Band.

Track listing

Personnel
Adapted from liner notes.

Emerson Drive
Patrick Bourque - bass guitar
Danick Dupelle - electric guitar, acoustic guitar, background vocals
Brad Mates - lead vocals
Mike Melancon - drums
David Pichette - fiddle, mandolin
Dale Wallace - piano, keyboards, organ, background vocals

Additional musicians
Dave Hoffner - strings (track 3)
Gordon Mote - strings (track 7)

Technical 
Brad Allen - producer (on tracks 1, 4, 5, 9, 10)
Keith Follesé - producer (on tracks 1, 4, 5, 9, 10)
Ben Fowler - mixing (track 11)
Teddy Gentry - producer (all tracks except 1, 4, 5, 9, 10)
Josh Leo - producer (all tracks except 1, 4, 5, 9, 10)
Justin Niebank - mixing (except track 11)

Charts

Weekly charts

Year-end charts

References

2006 albums
Emerson Drive albums
Albums produced by Josh Leo
Midas Records Nashville albums